Mari Holopainen (born 31 January 1981 in Espoo) is a Finnish politician currently serving in the Parliament of Finland for the Green League at the Helsinki constituency.

References

1981 births
Living people
People from Espoo
Green League politicians
Members of the Parliament of Finland (2019–23)
21st-century Finnish women politicians
Women members of the Parliament of Finland